List of PlayStation games may refer to:

 List of PlayStation (console) video games:
 List of PlayStation games (A–L)
 List of PlayStation games (M–Z)
 List of video games for other Sony PlayStation consoles:
 List of PlayStation 2 games (A–K)
 List of PlayStation 2 games (L–Z)
 List of PlayStation 3 games (A–C)
 List of PlayStation 3 games (D–I)
 List of PlayStation 3 games (J–P)
 List of PlayStation 3 games (Q–Z)
 List of PlayStation 4 games (A–L)
 List of PlayStation 4 games (M–Z)
 List of PlayStation 5 games

Games